Catherine Claude (23 December 1924 — 23 August 2000), nom de plume of Catherine Piermont, née Jeanne Guillaud, was a French novelist, essayist and literary critic, and former president of the Writers' Union of France.

Biography

Youth
Her youth is deeply influenced by the engagement of her parents in the French Communist Party, where they met. The Spanish Civil War marks a break in his life. His father entered in 1936 in the International Brigades, in whose ranks he died at the Battle of Teruel. She was raised until the war with a young Spanish refugee welcomed by his mother after the defeat of the Republicans.

World War Two
She studied at Lycée Stendhal in Grenoble. She was close to her French teacher, Colette Audry (1906-1990), who published several novels after the war and whose influence probably played a role in her vocation as a writer. She joined the French Resistance in 1943 in the immigrant workforce (MOI), an organization of the Communist Party gathering immigrants, the most active in the Resistance in Grenoble in 1943. She fought under the authority of Charles Wolmark, who is arrested by the Gestapo and shot at Charnècles. She meets the man who becomes his companion then his husband and who was then called Claude Henriot.

She later chose to take as a pen name a name formed by the meeting of the two first names, Catherine and Claude, under whom she and her future husband who, for security reasons, wore false identities, met each other. She was in charge until May 1944 to develop in the lycées of Grenoble another organization dependent on the Communist Party, the National Movement Against Racism. She was then sent to Lyon in May 1944 and to Marseille where she joined Claude.

Writer and militant feminist
She joined the Communist Party in January 1945. She participated at Ce soir, a newspaper created by the Communist Party in 1937, as a journalist in the foreign policy department. She got married in 1945. She moved with her husband to Grenoble and worked as a journalist for the newspaper Le Travailleur alpin, from September 1945 to June 1946. She was active in the Communist Party, particularly in the Union of French Women. She and Claude distanced themselves in 1956 after the repression of the Budapest uprising by the USSR and the publication of the Khrushchev Thaw.

She reapproached the Communist Party in 1968 and participated in the creation of the Union of Soviet Writers, by a group led notably by Jean-Pierre Faye, Nathalie Sarraute and Michel Butor.

She carried out several commitments by mixing writing, militant action and theoretical reflection around what remains like the great affairs of her life:

 the emancipation of women: La Querelle des femmes, Élever seul son enfant;
 social emancipation through the popular struggle: C'est la fête de l'Humanité;
 historical reflection: L'Enfance de l'humanité;
 ecology: Voyages et aventures en écologie.

She defended a feminism based on the search for authentic femininity more than on the fight against men. About her book La Querelle des femmes, Christian Massé wrote: "From the Frankish woman to the red woman of May 1968, Catherine Claude describes a je-femme fighting for the parity of the two sexes" and, further: "Catherine Claude pronounces 333 times the word woman without ever condemning man." Lighter, Paris en zigzag, written with Colette Franc, is a walk in Paris over the course of history.

She signed the Manifesto of the 343 published in Le Nouvel Observateur on 5 April 1971, in which 343 women declared having an abortion, which was then prohibited. She collaborated with La Nouvelle Critique magazine during the 1960s and 1970s.

She moved away from the Communist Party in the late 1970s. She devoted herself to historical and linguistic research. L'Enfance de l'humanité is the product of this reflection. She studies the process by which hierarchical societies with hierarchical languages gradually dominated and eliminated peaceful, non-hierarchical societies.

Selected works

Novels
 La Lune et le Soleil, 1959.
 Le Magot de Josepha, 1960.
 La Mort d'Armand, 1961.
 La Fête à Chaville, 1964.
 Ciel blanc, 1967. Prix littéraire de la Résistance, 1967.

Essays
 Un certain Bourvil, 1969. Rééditions, Messidor, 1990.
 Rabelais, 1972.
 Élever seul son enfant, 1975.
 La Querelle des femmes, 1995.
 C'est la fête de l'humanité, 1978.
 Voyage et Aventures en Écologie, 1976.
 Paris en zigzag, 1975. Co-written with Colette Franc.
 Elles, 1975.
 L'Enfance de l'humanité, 1997.

References

1924 births
2000 deaths
French communists
French feminists
French socialist feminists
French Resistance members
20th-century French women
Signatories of the 1971 Manifesto of the 343